Samuel Friedrich Capricornus (born Samuel Friedrich Bockshorn; 21 December 1628 – 10 November 1665) was a Czech composer of the Baroque period.

Life
Samuel Friedrich Capricornus was born on 21 December 1628 in Žerčice. Capricornus' father was a Protestant minister, who fled with his family for fear of the Counter-Reformation to Bratislava in the former Kingdom of Hungary. After completing high school in Sopron, he studied languages and theology in Silesia before becoming a musician at the imperial court in Vienna. Here, he became acquainted with the music of Giovanni Valentini and Antonio Bertali. After a short stay in Reutlingen he worked for two years as a private music teacher in Bratislava and then from 1651 to 1657 he was active as a music director in various churches and as a music teacher at a high school there.

In May 1657 he became Kapellmeister in Stuttgart and soon became engaged in a bitter dispute with the organist of the collegiate church, Philipp Friedrich Böddecker, who had himself coveted the position, and his brother David, a cornetto player. Already in September 1657, David Böddecker had complained about a "high and difficult piece" which he had been asked to play by Capricornus and that he also had to play the "Quart-Zink" (a small, high pitched cornetto) and sing, which were not part of his job requirements. In his defense against these allegations, Capricornus complained about the unruliness, and the "gluttony and drunkenness" of the musicians in the kapell, also saying the cornetto players played their instruments like a cow horn.

Capricornus remained in this post until his death in 1665. He died on 10 November 1665 in Stuttgart, at the age of 36.

Works (selection)
Verzeichnis der erhaltenen Werke von Samuel Capricornus CWV  Cornetto-Verlag 2016

Published works
, Christoff Gerhard, Nürnberg 1655 ; Cornetto-Verlag, Stuttgart (facsimile)
, Endter, Nürnberg 1658 ; Cornetto-Verlag, Stuttgart (facsimile)
, Johann Weyrich Rösslin, Stuttgart 1659
, Johann Weyrich Rösslin, Stuttgart 1660
, Berliner Chormusik-Verlag/Edition Musica Rinata, Ditzingen 2000
, Cornetto-Verlag, Stuttgart 2004
, Author & Christoph Gerhard, Nürnberg 1660
' for 2 sopranos, 4 viols (ad lib.) and b.c., Christoff Gerhard, Nürnberg 1660 ; Cornetto-Verlag, Stuttgart (facsimile). First edition available at IMSLP.

Jubilus Bernhardi for SSATB, 4 Viols and B.c., Endter, Nürnberg 1660 ; Strube Verlag, Berlin 2003. First edition available at IMSLP.

, Johann Weyrich Rösslin, Stuttgart 1664
, Edition Musica Rinata, Ditzingen 2002
, Carus-Verlag, Leinfelden-Echterdingen 1998
, Edition Musica Rinata, Ditzingen 2000
, Edition Musica Rinata, Ditzingen 2003
, Stuttgart 1665 ; Cornetto-Verlag, Stuttgart (facsimile)

, Bencard, Würzburg 1669 ; Cornetto-Verlag, Stuttgart (facsimile)
, Bencard, Würzburg 1669. First edition available at IMSLP.

, Ammon, Frankfurt 1669 ; Cornetto-Verlag, Stuttgart (facsimile). First edition available at IMSLP.

, Edition Musica Poetica, St. Peter-Ording 2008
, Edition Musica Poetica, St. Peter-Ording 2008

, Bencard, Frankfurt 1670 ; Cornetto-Verlag, Stuttgart (facsimile). First edition available at IMSLP.

Tafelmusik, Bencard, Frankfurt 1670 ; Cornetto-Verlag, Stuttgart (facsimile and modern edition)
Continuatio der Tafelmusik 1671 ; Cornetto-Verlag, Stuttgart (facsimile and modern edition)
 1672. The entire collection was published as a work by Bertali, however several Sonatas in part two are known to be by Capricornus.

Other works
Audio Domini Deus meus, Cornetto-Verlag, Stuttgart 2008
Beati immaculati in via, Manuscript, 1690 ; Cornetto-Verlag, Stuttgart 2008
Ciacona for violin, viola da gamba and B.c., in Partiturbuch Ludwig, Manuscript 1662 ;  Cornetto-Verlag, Stuttgart 2006
Deus docuisti me, Cornetto-Verlag, Stuttgart 2003
Jauchzet dem Herrn, Cornetto-Verlag, Stuttgart 2004
Magnificat for voices (SSATB), 2 violins and b.c.
Mass in F for SATB, 2 violins and B.c., Cornetto-Verlag, Stuttgart 2003
Quae fata spes vè fingo?, Cornetto-Verlag, Stuttgart
Quis dabit capiti meo aquam, Cornetto-Verlag, Stuttgart 2008
Raptus Proserpinae, Opera, Cornetto-Verlag, Stuttgart (facsimile of libretto)
Sonata in E minor for violin and b.c. Cornetto-Verlag, Stuttgart (modern edition)
Sonata à 8 in A minor for 3 violins, 2 violas, 2 violas da gamba, viola di basso and b.c., Manuscript 1667
Willkommen, edles Knäblein, Edition Musica Rinata, Ditzingen 2000

Recordings 
 Jesu nostra Redemptio (from Scelta musicale), Hana Blažíková, CordArte, Pan Classics (CD, 2013).
 Theatrum Musicum & Leçons de Ténèbres, Benoit Haller, La Chapelle Rhénane, K617 (CD, 2016).
 Dulcis amor, Jesu (from Geistliche Harmonien, III, 1664) Harry van der Kamp, Laurie Reviol. Ensemble Tirami Su, Challenge Classics (CD, 2002)
 Theatrum Musicum, Martin Gester, Le Parlement De Musique, Opus 111 (CD, 1994)

References

External links
 

1628 births
1665 deaths
People from Mladá Boleslav District
People from the Kingdom of Bohemia
Czech Baroque composers
Czech male classical composers
17th-century classical composers
17th-century male musicians